Mohammed Kadharsha (born October 6, 1935) is an Indian politician from the All India Anna Dravida Munnetra Kazhagam. He served as a member of the Rajya Sabha from April 3, 1974 to April 2, 1980 and July 25, 1983 to July 24, 1989.

Family 

Kadharsha was born on October 6, 1935 to K. Mohammed and has studied up to graduation. Kadharsha is married to Laila Kadharsha. The couple has two sons and two daughters.

References

External links 
 

1935 births
Living people